Harold J. Wirths (born April 5, 1965) is an American Republican politician who has served in the New Jersey General Assembly since 2018, representing the 24th Legislative District. He previously served as Commissioner of the New Jersey Department of Labor and Workforce Development from May 24, 2010 to August 1, 2016, appointed by former Governor Chris Christie in 2010.

Wirths has served in the General Assembly since 2020 as the Minority Budget Officer.

Early life 
Wirths is the adopted son of Wallace R. Wirths (1921–2002), a former Westinghouse executive, author, newspaper columnist and radio commentator, who was a benefactor of Upsala College in East Orange, New Jersey (now defunct), from which Wirths would go on to graduate with an associates degree in business.

Wirths was a small business owner in Sussex County in northwestern New Jersey, owning and managing furniture stores located near Hamburg, New Jersey. He also helped to establish Noble Community Bank, which today is part of Highlands State Bank, and he served on the Highlands Bank board of directors. Wirths resides in Wantage Township, New Jersey with his wife and two daughters.

Sussex County Board of Chosen Freeholders 
Wirths ran for Sussex County's Board of Chosen Freeholders as a Republican and served as a freeholder for nearly a decade from 2000 to 2010. He resigned from that post to become Labor Commissioner and was succeeded as Freeholder by Parker Space.

Labor Commissioner 
Chris Christie nominated Wirths to be the Commissioner of the New Jersey Department of Labor and Workforce Development (2010-2016) and was sworn in on May 24, 2010. One of his focuses as commissioner, was to modernize the state's unemployment insurance benefits system and reducing waste attributed to benefits fraud. He served on the boards of several state government commissions and authorities, including the New Jersey Economic Development Authority, New Jersey State Ethics Commission, New Jersey State Employment and Training Commission, and the Fort Monmouth Economic Revitalization Authority.

Under the leadership of Commissioner Wirths, the New Jersey Department of Labor and Workforce Development launched an employer-focused approach to reshape the state's workforce development and training programs.

New Jersey Assembly 
In 2017, he ran for the New Jersey General Assembly in the 24th Legislative District, bracketed with Parker Space and won election with 30,028 votes (27.91% of the ballots cast).

Committee assignments 
Committee assignments for the current session are:
Budget
Joint Budget Oversight

District 24 
Each of the 40 districts in the New Jersey Legislature has one representative in the New Jersey Senate and two members in the New Jersey General Assembly. The representatives from the 24th District for the 2022—23 Legislative Session are:
 Senator Steve Oroho (R)
 Assemblyman Parker Space (R)
 Assemblyman Hal Wirths (R)

Electoral history

New Jersey Assembly 

</ref>

References

External links
Legislative webpage

1965 births
Living people
County commissioners in New Jersey
Politicians from Sussex County, New Jersey
Republican Party members of the New Jersey General Assembly
People from Wantage Township, New Jersey
State cabinet secretaries of New Jersey
Upsala College alumni
American adoptees
21st-century American politicians